Force West, later known as Shakane, was an English, Bristol-based pop band of the 1960s and 1970s.

Formed in 1964, Force West was a five piece pop band from Bristol UK. Originally created from the amalgamation of two local bands, Danny Clarke and the Jaguars and Johnny Dee and the Diatones. Original members were Charlie Dobson (aka Danny Clarke - Lead vocals), John (Sid) Phillips (Drums and Vocals), Adrian Castillo (Guitar and Vocals), John Strange (Bass Guitar and Vocals) and Mike Hewer (Guitar and Vocals). Hewer was replaced by Brian Trusler in 1965.

Eight Force West singles were released between 1965 and 1969, but no commercial success was forthcoming.

In 1969, following the release of a final single Sherry, a cover of the classic Four Seasons hit, lead vocalist Charlie Dobson decided to leave the band and venture into the world of business. The remaining four band members took the name "Shakane" and reinvented their sound and image.

Signed to Miki Dallon's Youngblood label under the management of Jim Buckingham and Kink’s manager Robert Wace, Shakane  enjoyed some success with the singles Big Step and Love Machine on the  European mainland but UK success passed them by. In 1972 a chance meeting at a local gig resulted in Shakane becoming the House Band at the Towns Talk night club on the Bridgewater Road in Bristol. This uncontracted engagement eventually lasted for some seventeen years. In January 1984 bass player John Strange decided to leave the band and after working their way through a number of itinerant players Shakane engaged ex Hot Dog Jackson guitarist Bob Pedrick as replacement.

Shakane finally disbanded in 2014 due to health reasons - bringing to an end a musical journey that had lasted for 50 years.

Discography

UK singles
Force West
Can't Give What I Haven't Got / Why Won't She Stay (Decca F12223) 1965
Gotta Find Another Baby / Talkin' About Our Love (Columbia DB7908) 1966
When The Sun Comes Out (The Weather Man) / Gotta Tell Somebody (Columbia DB7963) 1966
All The Children Sleep / Desolation (Columbia DB8174) 1967
On A Quiet Night / The Room Revolves Around Me (as The Oscar Bicycle) (CBS 3237) 1968
I'll Walk In The Rain / What's It To Be (CBS 3632) 1968
Like The Tide Like The Ocean / I'll Be Moving On (CBS 3798) 1968
Sherry / Mr. Blue (CBS 4385) 1969
Big Step / Rhona (as Shekane [sic]) (UPC 103) 1970
Rhona / Find The Lady (as Shakane) (UPC 110) 1970
Love Machine / Mr. Jackson (as Shakane) (Young Blood International YB 1004) 1972
Jenny / Gang Man (as Shakane) (Rockfield / United Artists UP 36087) 1976

Extended plays
 Split EP with Mecki Mark Men (JUKEbox, 1972)

References

English pop music groups